Wilhelm Ganzhorn (1818–1880) was a German judge and lyricist known for his 1851 song "Im schönsten Wiesengrunde". The melody of "Gi Talo Gi Halom Tasi", which is the regional anthem of the Northern Mariana Islands, is based on it.

References 

19th-century jurists
Jurists from Baden-Württemberg
German lyricists
People from Böblingen
1818 births
1880 deaths
19th-century German writers
19th-century German male writers